George Barry (1748–1805) was a Scottish minister, the author of a History of the Orkney Islands.

Life
Barry was a native of Berwickshire. He studied at the University of Edinburgh. After receiving a licence as a preacher from the Edinburgh presbytery of the Church of Scotland, he continued to act as tutor in a gentleman's family until in 1782 he obtained a presentation to the second charge of Kirkwall. The dislike of a portion of the congregation to his preaching resulted before long in the formation of a Secession congregation in the parish. In 1793 he was translated to Shapinsay. He received in 1804 the degree of D.D. from the university of Edinburgh.

Works
Shortly before his death at Shapinsay on 11 May 1805 he published a History of the Orkney Islands, including a view of the ancient and modern inhabitants, their monuments of antiquity, their natural history, the present state of their agriculture, manufactures, and commerce, and the means of their improvement. A second edition, with additions and improvements by the Rev. James Headrick, appeared in 1808. Barry's History contains his own research, but depends also on the unpublished manuscripts of George Low.

References

Attribution

1748 births
1805 deaths
18th-century Scottish writers
19th-century Scottish writers
Alumni of the University of Edinburgh
18th-century Ministers of the Church of Scotland
18th-century Scottish educators
Scottish non-fiction writers
History of Orkney
Religion in Orkney